Louis-Gabriel Du Buat-Nançay (2 March 1732, Tortisambert near Livarot – 18 September 1787, Nançay) was an 18th-century French playwright, historian and political writer.

Born in a noble family of Normandy, Du Buat-Nançay began his diplomatic career as an aide to Hubert de Folard (1709-1803), French ambassador to the Holy Roman Empire. He later became Minister of France in Dresden and Regensburg, then settled in Germany where he married; he spent his last years on his estate in Berry .

Main publications 
1757: Les Origines, ou l’Ancien gouvernement de la France, de l’Allemagne, de l’Italie, etc., The Hague, 4 vol. in- 12; 1789, 3 vol. in-8° 
1772: Histoire ancienne des peuples de l’Europe, Paris, Suard et Arnaud, 12 vol. in-12° ; 
1773: Éléments de la politique, ou Recherche des vrais principes de l'économie sociale, 6 vol. in-8° ;
1778: les Maximes du gouvernement monarchique, 4 vol. in-8°, (against the book by Mey, Maultrot, Aubry).
1785: Lettre d’un anti-philosophe de province aux philosophes de la capitale.
1785: Remarques d'un Français; ou, Examen impartial du livre de M. Necker sur l'administration des finances de France, pour servir de correctif et de supplément à son ouvrage

He translated the Tableau du gouvernement actuel de l'Allemagne, ou Abrégé du droit public de l'Empire traduit de l'allemand, avec des notes historiques et critiques, par M***, Paris, veuve Bordelet, 1755, in-12°, by Johann Jakob Schmauss.

Sources 
 François-Xavier de Feller, Dictionnaire historique ; ou, Histoire abrégée des hommes qui se sont fait un nom, t. 4, Paris, Houdaille, 1836, (p. 225).

External links 

 Louis-Gabriel Du Buat-Nançay on data.bnf.fr
  

1732 births
1787 deaths
People from Livarot-Pays-d'Auge
Writers from Normandy
18th-century French writers
18th-century French male writers
18th-century French diplomats
18th-century French historians
French translators
German–French translators
18th-century French translators